Charles E. "Chuck" Brymer (born July 30, 1959) is an American businessman, marketing strategist, author, and former President and CEO of DDB Worldwide, an advertising agency.

Early years
Chuck Brymer was born in Louisville, Kentucky the third of four children of Natalie and Robert L. Brymer, then a senior advertising executive at McCann Erikson. He graduated from the University of Kentucky's College of Communications & Information with a Bachelor of Arts in communications in 1981.

Career
Brymer worked at various television stations and ad agencies during college. In 1982, he opened and ran BBDO's Houston office at age 24. During his tenure at BBDO, Brymer worked on the company's Chrysler account. He left BBDO for Interbrand, a global branding consulting firm in 1985. In 1986, while at Interbrand, Chuck Brymer was named one of Fortune Magazine's People to Watch at age 27.

At Interbrand, Brymer served as founding president of the British company's U.S. Division. He also worked closely with Interbrand founder and CEO John Murphy. Interbrand was purchased by Omnicom Group in 1993. In 1994, Omnicom appointed Brymer president and CEO of Interbrand. During Brymer's tenure as CEO, Interbrand added multiple international offices.

In 2006, at age 46, Brymer became president and CEO of Omnicom-owned DDB Worldwide, overseeing the company's 200 offices worldwide. He was replaced by Wendy Clark in 2018.

Brymer also helped create Businessweek's "World's Most Valuable Brands" feature. He has advised the U.S. State Department on the United States' international image.

Brymer is active in corporate governance. He was appointed to the boards of Regal Entertainment Group and the Ad Council in 2007. Brymer also serves on the board of Chamber of Commerce of the United States.

Author
Brymer is the author of The Nature of Marketing: Marketing to the Swarm as Well as the Herd. He is also a co-author of The Economist's Brands and Branding.

Personal life
He is married to Tracy Brymer. He has four children.

References

External links
 DDB
 Interbrand
 Brand Channel

American chief executives
American advertising executives
Businesspeople from Louisville, Kentucky
1959 births
Living people